Liocranidae is a family of araneomorph spiders first described by Eugène Simon in 1897. They are one of several groups called "sac spiders". The holarctic genus Agroeca is the best-known, but it also includes various genera of more obscure spiders that still lack a diagnosis. Two species in the North American genus Neoanagraphis are found in the extremely dry conditions in the Mojave, Sonoran and Chihuahuan deserts. Females live in animal burrows while males wander and are the ones most often caught in pitfall traps.

Genera

, the World Spider Catalog accepts the following genera:

Agraecina Simon, 1932 — Europe, Africa, Kazakhstan
Agroeca Westring, 1861 — Asia, Europe, Africa, South America, North America
Andromma Simon, 1893 — Africa
Apostenus Westring, 1851 — Africa, United States, Europe
Arabelia Bosselaers, 2009 — Greece, Turkey
Argistes Simon, 1897 — Sri Lanka
Coryssiphus Simon, 1903 — South Africa
Cteniogaster Bosselaers & Jocqué, 2013 — Tanzania, Kenya
Cybaeodes Simon, 1878 — Europe, Algeria
Donuea Strand, 1932 — Madagascar
Hesperocranum Ubick & Platnick, 1991 — United States
Jacaena Thorell, 1897 — Asia
Koppe Deeleman-Reinhold, 2001 — Asia, Papua New Guinea
Laudetia Gertsch, 1941 — Dominica
Liocranoeca Wunderlich, 1999 — United States, Europe, Russia
Liocranum L. Koch, 1866 — Europe, Ethiopia, Asia, Papua New Guinea, Cuba
Liparochrysis Simon, 1909 — Australia
Mesiotelus Simon, 1897 — Europe, Asia, Kenya
Mesobria Simon, 1898 — Saint Vincent and the Grenadines
Neoanagraphis Gertsch & Mulaik, 1936 — United States, Mexico
Oedignatha Thorell, 1881 — Asia, Oceania, Seychelles
Paratus Simon, 1898 — Asia
Platnick Marusik & Fomichev, 2020 — Tajikistan
Rhaeboctesis Simon, 1897 — Angola, Namibia, South Africa
Sagana Thorell, 1875 — Europe, the Caucasus 
Scotina Menge, 1873 — Algeria, Malta, Asia
Sesieutes Simon, 1897 — Asia
Sestakovaia Zamani & Marusik, 2021 — Europe, Iran
Sphingius Thorell, 1890 — Asia
Sudharmia Deeleman-Reinhold, 2001 — Indonesia
Teutamus Thorell, 1890 — Asia
Toxoniella Warui & Jocqué, 2002 — Kenya
Vankeeria Bosselaers, 2012 — Greece
Xenoplectus Schiapelli & Gerschman, 1958 — Argentina

See also
 List of Liocranidae species

References

External links

Arachnology Home Pages: Araneae
 

 
Araneomorphae families